Lawrence Roland Prittipaul (born 19 October 1979) is an English former cricketer.

Life and career
Prittipaul was born at Portsmouth in October 1979 to Indo-Guyanese parents. His cousin is the former West Indian batsman Shivnarine Chanderpaul. He was educated in Portsmouth at St John's College.

Prittipaul first played representative cricket for the Hampshire Cricket Board (HCB) in the MCCA Knockout Trophy in 1998 and 1999, with his List A one-day debut coming for the HCB against Suffolk at Bury St Edmunds in the 1999 NatWest Trophy. Later in the 1999 season, Prittipaul made his senior debut for Hampshire against Worcestershire in the CGU National League. The following season, made his debut in first-class cricket for Hampshire against Kent at Canterbury in the County Championship, with him top-scoring in Hampshire's first innings with 52. Two games later he recorded what would be his only first-class century, making 152 against Derbyshire, which was the last first-class century to be scored at the County Ground prior to its closure at the end of the 2000 season. He also scored the last one-day half century at the ground against Nottinghamshire, in what was Hampshire's final match at the ground. 

He scored the first century at the Rose Bowl in a Second Eleven match against Glamorgan in June 2000, though the match carried no status. Like his teammates, Prittipaul struggled to adjust to the new pitches at the Rose Bowl in their early years. As his first-class opportunities became less, Prittipaul was predominantly used by Hampshire in one-day cricket. He made his Twenty20 debut at the Rose Bowl against Essex in the 2003 Twenty20 Cup. By 2005, he was considered a bit part player in the Hampshire team. Nonetheless, he formed an important match-winning partnership with Nic Pothas in a 2005 Twenty20 Cup fixture against Kent, scoring 35 runs off 24 balls in a partnership worth 72 runs for the fifth wicket. He retired from the professional game in 2005, having made 23 first-class, 62 List A, and 13 Twenty20 appearances. In first-class cricket, he scored 975 runs at an average of 28.67, In his 62 one-day matches, 59 of which came for Hampshire, he scored 564 runs with one half century. His 13 Twenty20 matches saw him score 84 runs. Prittipaul had limited returns with his medium pace bowling across all formats.

Following his retirement, he played club cricket for various teams in the Southern Premier Cricket League, and later co-founded Cage Cricket, which was launched in 2011 with the support of Ian Botham. It was exhibited to the Royal Dutch Cricket Association (KNCB) in 2012, who launched the concept in Nijmegen.

References

External links

1979 births
Living people
Cricketers from Portsmouth
English people of Indo-Guyanese descent
British sportspeople of Indian descent
British Asian cricketers
People educated at St John's College, Portsmouth
English cricketers
Hampshire Cricket Board cricketers
Hampshire cricketers
English inventors